William Dennison McCrackan (1864 – June 12, 1923) was an American journalist and author of books on history and travel. In 1900, he converted to Christian Science and became a Christian Science practitioner, teacher and lecturer.

Life 
McCrackan was born in Munich, Germany. His great-grandfather was Scottish and immigrated to New Haven, Connecticut around the time of the French and Indian War. He graduated from St. Paul's School in Concord, New Hampshire and Trinity College in Hartford in 1885, afterward traveling to Europe to continue his education at the Heidelberg University in Germany. He lived in Europe for several years before returning to the United States.

He lectured, particularly in New York, and became known for his books on history and travel. Politically progressive, he was well known in literary circles, was a member of the Authors' Club in New York City and was friends with Hamlin Garland, Henry George and Lord Bryce. McCrackan was an opponent of the slogan "a land without a people for a people without a land". He said, "We used to read in our papers the slogan of Zionism, 'to give back a people to a Land without a People,' while the truth was that Palestine was already well-peopled with a population which was rapidly increasing from natural causes."

McCrackan converted to Christian Science in 1900 and became active with the church organization, first serving as Committee on Publication for the state of New York for three years. In that function, he wrote two articles for the North American Review addressing articles they had recently published by Mark Twain, which had ridiculed Christian Science. He sent his articles to Twain, which Twain replied he had read "with admiration and with profit". McCrackan later called on Twain, and though they remained in disagreement regarding religion, they developed a cordial relationship. The last time McCrackan met with Twain, his wife was very ill and Twain, who wrote numerous articles critical of the religion, told McCrackan that he would gladly ask McCrackan to pray for her, except that his wife would rather die.

McCrackan, a Christian Science practitioner and teacher, began lecturing on the religion in 1904 and was elected First Reader of The Mother Church in 1905. He later became an associate editor of the Christian Science Sentinel.

In 1919, McCrackan had a major role in founding the Jerusalem News, the first English-language newspaper published in Palestine, and was a major contributor to it - though not physically present in Jerusalem.    

He died in New York on June 12, 1923.

Published work (partial list)

Articles
 "Our Foreign Policy" Arena magazine, (1893), pp 145-150
 "Andreas Hofer, The Hero of the Tirol" New England Magazine, (March 1896 - August 1896), pp 548–559
 "Emancipation" Christian Science Journal, (1919)

Books
 The Rise of the Swiss Republic (1892)
 Little idyls of the big world (1895)
 The Huntington letters (1897)
 The Fair Land Tyrol (1905)
 Christian Science: Its discovery and development A.D. 1866 (1915)
 The Spell of the Italian Lakes (1918)
 The New Palestine (1922)
 An American abroad and at home, recollections of W. D. McCrackan (1924)
 Mary Baker Eddy and Her Book, Science and Health with Key to the Scriptures (1925)

References 

1864 births
1923 deaths
American Christian Scientists
American male journalists
American non-fiction writers
Converts to Christian Science
Christian Science writers